Glory Daze is an American comedy-drama television series. The one-hour series revolves around a group of college freshmen who pledge a fraternity in 1986. The series aired from November 16, 2010, to January 18, 2011, on TBS.

On February 24, 2011, TBS announced that the series would not be renewed for a second season due to poor ratings.

Premise
Set in 1986 in the state of Indiana, the series revolves around a group of friends entering their freshman year of college at Hayes University. The young men must deal with being on their own for the first time and preparing for what is to come in their college years.

Cast and characters

Main
 Kelly Blatz as Joel Harrington - Joel is a pre-med student and is very dedicated to his studies. In the beginning of the series he has second thoughts on joining the Omega Sigma fraternity knowing it would disappoint his father. He later decides to join after being encouraged by his friends. He has strong feelings for Christie, Damon's girlfriend. He is a devout Catholic.
 Matt Bush as Eli Feldman - Eli enters college as a virgin and desperately wants to lose his innocence, despite his frequent bad luck with women. He is very impulsive when the right situation drives him to be. He is Jewish.
 Hartley Sawyer as Brian Sommers - Brian is a jock and is admitted to Hayes University on a baseball scholarship. He is willing to do anything to help his friends and is also quite intelligent, having a great knowledge of seemingly random information.
 Drew Seeley as Jason Wilson - Jason is rich and a Republican and has strong future aspirations to enter politics. He originally wanted to join the Zhea Rho fraternity due to their strong history of housing future politicians, but reconsiders to join his friends at Omega Sigma fraternity.
 Callard Harris as Mike Reno - Reno is one of the upperclassmen at the Omega Sigma fraternity. He has a very laid-back attitude and is always ready to guide the freshmen on the craziness of college life.
 Julianna Guill as Christie DeWitt - Christie is a student at Hayes University and is Damon's girlfriend. She is always very sweet and kind especially towards Joel, which is why Joel has romantic feelings for her. In the episode "Hit Me with Your Test Shot", she learns about Joel's feelings after seeing drawings of herself in Joel's notes. Even after Joel finds out about Christie knowing about the drawings, they still decide to stay friends.
 Tim Jo as Alex Chang - Alex is Eli's dorm roommate. He is Asian and decides to join the fraternity for Asian students but then quits due to the hard partying.
 James Earl as Tom "Turbo" Turley - Turbo is another upperclassman at the Omega Sigma fraternity and the pledgemaster. He is African-American and enjoys hip hop music. He is very kind to the freshmen but always ready to whip them into shape due to his strong dedication to the fraternity.
 Josh Brener as Zack Miller - Zack is Joel's dorm roommate. He is very awkward and makes people around him very uncomfortable.
 Chris D'Elia as William Xavier "Bill" Stankowski - Stankowski is an upperclassman at the Omega Sigma fraternity. He is known for being very wise and helpful. Not much is known about his personal life other than he has lived in the Omega Sigma house since 1976 and inhales a lot of cannabis.
 Tim Meadows as Professor Aloysius Haines - Professor Haines is Joel and Christie's Political science professor. He went through a difficult divorce with his wife and frequently expresses his personal problems and political opinions in front of his class. Joel always seems to get on his bad side, although there are times when Haines does accept that Joel tries his best to please him. He also serves as the Omega Sigma faculty advisor.

Supporting
 Eric Nenninger as Damon Smythe - Damon is the leader of the Omega Sigma fraternity. He is the most responsible person in the house and has no idea about Joel's feelings for his girlfriend Christie.
 David Guzman as Hector - Hector is a Mexican dwarf living in the fraternity house.
 Natalie Dreyfuss as Julie - Julie is Jason's girlfriend. She was accepted to Yale University, but chooses to attend Hayes to be with Jason. She sometimes questions her decision due to Jason messing up on a number of occasions.
 Teri Polo as Professor Larsen - Professor Larsen is an English professor at the university. After meeting Mike Reno at the grocery store, Reno appears to have the impression that Larsen's strict behavior is just a front to her actual witty and attractive personality.
 Alexandra Chando as Annabelle - Annabelle is Brian's girlfriend. They meet at a mixer with Kappa Theta sorority. At first she does not like jocks being that Brian is one, but quickly changes her mind after seeing his physique. It is later revealed that Annabelle and Brian break up after she joins a cult.
 Kim Shaw as Tammy - Tammy is the daughter of one of Joel's mother's friends. Since being set up with Joel, she is very infatuated with him.
 Brad Garrett as Jerry Harrington - Jerry is Joel's father. He disapproves of Joel's decision to join a fraternity.
 Fred Willard as Dr. Reynolds - Dr. Reynolds is the University Hospital doctor. He treats Eli for a burn after a hazing went awry.
 D. L. Hughley as Coach Franklin - Coach Franklin is Brian's baseball coach. He is infertile, and looks to Brian as a surrogate son. His wife is Korean.

Guest stars
 Cheri Oteri as Maureen Harrington, Joel's mother
 John Michael Higgins as Brother Jerrold, the Omega Sig chapter master
 David Koechner as Coach D'Amato, Brian's original baseball coach
 Justin Chon as an Asian Frat Bro, an Asian fraternity brother who dislikes anyone who is not Asian
 Kevin Nealon as Marcus, fake ID maker
 Andy Richter as Father Sullivan, Hayes University priest
 Curtis Armstrong as Morty Feldman, Eli's father
 Reginald VelJohnson as Stan Turley, Turbo's father
 Geoff Pierson as Col. Zachariah Smythe, Damon's father
 Barry Bostwick as Mr. Wilson, Jason's father
 Ken Lerner as Rabbi Shapiro
 Michael McKean as Stu, Hayes University gardener
 Mindy Sterling as Movie ticket lady
 Gina Gershon as Lt. Lang, teacher of R.O.T.C. course
 Tasha Smith as Lea, Professor Haines' ex-wife
 Kathryn Fiore as Janie, a woman Eli nearly loses his virginity to

Episodes
With the exception of the pilot episode, every episode title is a parody reference to a popular 1980s song.

Development and production
The pilot was written by Walt Becker and Michael LeSieur, who received a cast-contingent pilot commitment from TBS in late January 2010. On May 14, 2010, TBS announced it had picked up the series with an eight-episode order. The order was increased to ten episodes in early November 2010, a week before the series premiere.

When speaking of the series, Michael Wright, the executive vice president and head of programming for TBS, TNT, and Turner Classic Movies said: "Glory Daze is a sharply written, laugh-out-loud comedy with a talented ensemble cast, including comic veteran Tim Meadows. The time is right for this feel-good, funny, and fresh take on college life in the '80s."

Glory Daze was filmed at USC's Mudd Hall of Philosophy and on both the UCLA campus and the former Ambassador College campus in Pasadena, CA.

The show's theme song, "Police on My Back", is performed by The Clash.

Critical reception
The show received a mixed reaction. On Metacritic, the series received "mixed or average reviews", reflected by a Metascore of 47 out of 100, based on 18 reviews.

International broadcasts

References

External links

2010 American television series debuts
2011 American television series endings
2010s American college television series
2010s American comedy-drama television series
English-language television shows
TBS (American TV channel) original programming
Television series about teenagers
Television series set in 1986
Television shows set in Indiana
Television series by Warner Horizon Television
Television series by Studio T